Boromorphus is a genus of darkling beetles in the family Tenebrionidae. There are at least four described species in Boromorphus, found in the Palearctic.

Species
These species belong to the genus Boromorphus:
 Boromorphus italicus Gardini, 2010
 Boromorphus saudicus Schawaller, 2013
 Boromorphus parvus Wollaston, 1865
 Boromorphus tagenioides (Lucas, 1849)

References

Tenebrionoidea